Joshua Martin Neer (born March 24, 1983) is an American bare-knuckle boxer and former mixed martial artist. A professional competitor since 2003, he has competed for the UFC, Bellator, the Quad Cities Silverbacks of the IFL, and Shark Fights. Neer is the former Shark Fights Interim Welterweight Champion.

Background
Neer is from Des Moines, Iowa and began wrestling when he was six years old. In high school, he played football, was an All-Conference baseball player, and in wrestling, he finished fourth in the state for his senior season. Neer continued wrestling at Waldorf College, but got injured and dropped out after only a year. Neer began boxing when he was 18 years old.

Mixed martial arts career

Early career
Neer went 89–1 as an amateur, sometimes fighting two to three times in one night. He received his nickname "The Dentist", by knocking the teeth out of two consecutive opponents during his amateur career.

Neer began his professional career on March 15, 2003 by knocking out Josh Kennedy. He proceeded to win twice, and draw once, before losing to Spencer "The King" Fisher by split decision. After losing to Fisher, Neer won each of his next ten fights.

UFC
Neer signed with the UFC and lost his first fight to Drew Fickett by submission at the inaugural UFC Ultimate Fight Night.

Neer fought his next three fights outside the UFC and went 2–1 before going back to the UFC.
He submitted Melvin Guillard at Ultimate Fight Night 2 and beat Joe Stevenson, who won the Welterweight division of The Ultimate Fighter 2, at Ultimate Fight Night 3. Neer then lost his next two fights, to Josh Burkman at UFC 61 and by submission to Nick Diaz at UFC 62.

Again out of the UFC, Neer went 6–1 in his next seven fights before returning to defeat Din Thomas at UFC Fight Night: Florian vs Lauzon. He lost to Nate Diaz in the main event at UFC Fight Night: Diaz vs Neer, but followed that defeat with a win at UFC Fight Night: Lauzon vs Stephens over The Ultimate Fighter: Team Hughes vs Team Serra winner, Mac Danzig, by triangle choke in the second round.

Neer lost a unanimous decision over Kurt Pellegrino. Throughout the fight Neer made signals that Pellegrino was not doing anything, and was visibly upset at the end of the third round. Neer fought Gleison Tibau as a late replacement for injured Sean Sherk at UFC 104 on October 24, 2009 and lost the fight due to a unanimous decision. Neer was subsequently released from the UFC with a record of 2–3 since his return to the organization.

Post-UFC
In his first fight following his latest UFC release, Neer defeated Matt Delanoit by TKO at MAX Fights DM Ballroom Brawl IV in Des Moines, Iowa, on January 8. He followed up with another win at Shark Fights 8, winning the Interim Welterweight Championship, which he also successfully defended once.

UFC return
Neer returned to the UFC to defeat Keith Wisniewski by TKO (cut) at the end of the second round on October 1, 2011 at UFC on Versus 6.

Neer next faced Duane Ludwig on January 20, 2012 at UFC on FX: Guillard vs. Miller. Despite being hurt on several occasions via Ludwig's punches, Neer persevered and won the fight via technical submission in the first round.

Neer faced Mike Pyle on June 8, 2012 at UFC on FX 3. Pyle defeated Neer via first-round knockout.

Neer fought Justin Edwards on October 5, 2012 at UFC on FX 5. He lost the fight via guillotine choke 45 seconds into the first round.

Neer faced Ultimate Fighter Season 11 winner Court McGee on February 23, 2013 at UFC 157. Neer lost the bout via unanimous decision. He was subsequently released from the UFC again after his loss to McGee.

Independent circuit
On December 14, 2013, Neer faced former UFC veteran Anthony Smith at VFC 41. Neer won via submission (rear-naked choke). Neer then faced Ron Jackson at MCC 54: Grigsby vs. Morrow on June 27, 2014. He won the fight via first round TKO.

Bellator
At Bellator 17, Neer was defeated by Bellator Lightweight Champion Eddie Alvarez via rear-naked choke at 2:08 in the second round. Alvarez gained control of Neer's back in the standing position. Neer refused to tap, and was rendered unconscious as a result.

Neer returned to the promotion to face Paul Bradley on October 17, 2014 at Bellator 129. He lost the fight by unanimous decision and left frustrated by the repeated ground attack by Bradley.

Neer was scheduled to face Matt Secor at Bellator 140 on July 17, 2015.  However, this fight did not happen.

Neer eventually made his return against André Santos at Bellator 146 on November 20, 2015.  He lost the fight by unanimous decision.

Post-Bellator
After the second, two-fight stint in Bellator, Neer faced Anthony Smith in a rematch at VFC 47 on January 14, 2016. He lost the fight via first-round knockout.

Personal life
Neer has a daughter. Before he was fighting professionally, Neer worked in construction.

On New Year's Eve 2008 Neer was involved in a high-speed chase with law enforcement in Des Moines, Iowa after reportedly hitting a squad car before fleeing the scene. The chase lasted for 20 miles during which Neer reportedly hit speeds in excess of 100 miles per hour before blowing out a tire due to spike strips placed by police. He faced charges of operating a vehicle while intoxicated, eluding police, hit-and-run, and various other traffic violations. He pleaded guilty to two charges and did not receive jail time but instead received a suspended sentence.

Bare-knuckle boxing
Neer competed in a bare-knuckle boxing match at 200 lbs. for the World Bare Knuckle Fighting Federation on November 9, 2018. He won after his opponent retired two minutes into the third round.

Championships and accomplishments
Ultimate Fighting Championship
Fight of the Night (Three times) vs. Melvin Guillard, Nate Diaz, Mac Danzig 
Shark Fights
Shark Fights Interim Welterweight Championship (One time)
One successful title defense
Victory Fighting Championship
VFC Welterweight Championship (One time)

Mixed martial arts record

|-
| Loss
| align=center| 36–16–1
| Anthony Smith
| TKO (elbows)
| VFC 47
| 
| align=center| 1
| align=center| 3:27
| Omaha, Nebraska, United States
|
|-
| Loss
| align=center| 36–15–1
| André Santos
| Decision (unanimous)
| Bellator 146
| 
| align=center| 3
| align=center| 5:00
| Thackerville, Oklahoma, United States
| 
|-
| Loss
| align=center| 36–14–1
| Paul Bradley
| Decision (unanimous)
| Bellator 129
| 
| align=center| 3
| align=center| 5:00
| Council Bluffs, Iowa, United States
| 
|-
| Win
| align=center| 36–13–1
| Travis Coyle
| Submission (armbar)
| VFC 43
| 
| align=center| 1
| align=center| 1:37
| Ralston, Nebraska, United States
| 
|-
| Win
| align=center| 35–13–1
| Ron Jackson
| TKO (punches)
| MCC 54: Grigsby vs. Morrow
| 
| align=center| 1
| align=center| 4:20
| Des Moines, Iowa, United States
| 
|-
| Win
| align=center| 34–13–1
| Anthony Smith
| Submission (rear-naked choke)
| VFC 41
| 
| align=center| 3
| align=center| 3:48
| Ralston, Nebraska, United States
|
|-
| Loss
| align=center| 33–13–1
| Court McGee
| Decision (unanimous)
| UFC 157
| 
| align=center| 3
| align=center| 5:00
| Anaheim, California, United States
| 
|-
| Loss
| align=center| 33–12–1
| Justin Edwards
| Technical Submission (guillotine choke)
| UFC on FX: Browne vs. Bigfoot
| 
| align=center| 1
| align=center| 0:45
| Minneapolis, Minnesota, United States
| 
|-
| Loss
| align=center| 33–11–1
| Mike Pyle
| KO (punch)
| UFC on FX: Johnson vs. McCall
| 
| align=center| 1
| align=center| 4:56
| Sunrise, Florida, United States
| 
|-
| Win
| align=center| 33–10–1
| Duane Ludwig
| Technical Submission (guillotine choke)
| UFC on FX: Guillard vs. Miller
| 
| align=center| 1
| align=center| 3:04
| Nashville, Tennessee, United States
| 
|-
| Win
| align=center| 32–10–1
| Keith Wisniewski
| TKO (doctor stoppage)
| UFC Live: Cruz vs. Johnson
| 
| align=center| 2
| align=center| 5:00
| Washington D.C., United States
| 
|-
| Win
| align=center| 31–10–1
| Blas Avena
| TKO (punches and elbows)
| Superior Cage Combat 2
| 
| align=center| 1
| align=center| 2:54
| Las Vegas, Nevada, United States
| 
|-
| Win
| align=center| 30–10–1
| Jesse Juarez
| TKO (doctor stoppage)
| Shark Fights 16: Neer vs. Juarez
| 
| align=center| 1
| align=center| 4:57
| Odessa, Texas, United States
| 
|-
| Win
| align=center| 29–10–1
| Andre Kase
| TKO (punches)
| WWFC 2: Neer vs. Kase
| 
| align=center| 1
| align=center| 0:20
| Clive, Iowa, United States
| 
|-
| Win
| align=center| 28–10–1
| Jesse Finney
| Submission (guillotine choke)
| Fight Me MMA 1: The Battle Begins
| 
| align=center| 1
| align=center| 4:09
| St. Louis, Missouri, United States
| 
|-
| Loss
| align=center| 27–10–1
| Eddie Alvarez
| Technical Submission (standing rear-naked choke)
| Bellator 17
| 
| align=center| 2
| align=center| 2:08
| Boston, Massachusetts, United States
| 
|-
| Win
| align=center| 27–9–1
| Anselmo Martinez
| Submission (rear-naked choke)
| Shark Fights 8: Super Brawl
| 
| align=center| 1
| align=center| 3:05
| Lubbock, Texas, United States
| 
|-
| Win
| align=center| 26–9–1
| Matt Delanoit
| KO (punches)
| Max Fights DM: Ballroom Brawl 4
| 
| align=center| 1
| align=center| 3:48
| Des Moines, Iowa, United States
| 
|-
| Loss
| align=center| 25–9–1
| Gleison Tibau
| Decision (unanimous)
| UFC 104
| 
| align=center| 3
| align=center| 5:00
| Los Angeles, California, United States
| 
|-
| Loss
| align=center| 25–8–1
| Kurt Pellegrino
| Decision (unanimous)
| UFC 101
| 
| align=center| 3
| align=center| 5:00
| Philadelphia, Pennsylvania, United States
| 
|-
| Win
| align=center| 25–7–1
| Mac Danzig
| Submission (triangle choke)
| UFC Fight Night: Lauzon vs. Stephens
| 
| align=center| 2
| align=center| 3:36
| Tampa, Florida, United States
| 
|-
| Loss
| align=center| 24–7–1
| Nate Diaz
| Decision (split)
| UFC Fight Night: Diaz vs Neer
| 
| align=center| 3
| align=center| 5:00
| Omaha, Nebraska, United States
| 
|-
| Win
| align=center| 24–6–1
| Din Thomas
| Decision (unanimous)
| UFC Fight Night: Florian vs. Lauzon
| 
| align=center| 3
| align=center| 5:00
| Broomfield, Colorado, United States
|
|-
| Win
| align=center| 23–6–1
| Nick Sorg
| Submission (armbar)
| C3: Smokey Mountain Showdown
| 
| align=center| 1
| align=center| 2:16
| Cherokee, North Carolina, United States
| 
|-
| Win
| align=center| 22–6–1
| Paul Rodriguez
| TKO (punches)
| Greensparks: Full Contact Fighting 5
| 
| align=center| 1
| align=center| 1:39
| Des Moines, Iowa, United States
| 
|-
| Loss
| align=center| 21–6–1
| Mark Miller
| KO (punch)
| IFL: Chicago
| 
| align=center| 1
| align=center| 0:54
| Chicago, Illinois, United States
| 
|-
| Win
| align=center| 21–5–1
| Tyson Burris
| TKO (submission to punches)
| FSG: Coliseum Carnage
| 
| align=center| 1
| align=center| 2:31
| Ames, Iowa, United States
| 
|-
| Win
| align=center| 20–5–1
| Mark Gearhart
| TKO (punches)
| Greensparks: Full Contact Fighting 3
| 
| align=center| 1
| align=center| 0:21
| Iowa, United States
| 
|-
| Win
| align=center| 19–5–1
| TJ Waldburger
| TKO (punches)
| IFC: Road to Global Domination
| 
| align=center| 1
| align=center| 0:24
| Belton, Texas, United States
| 
|-
| Win
| align=center| 18–5–1
| Wayne Hajicek
| TKO (submission to punches)
| MCC 5: Thanksgiving Throwdown
| 
| align=center| 1
| align=center| 2:30
| Des Moines, Iowa, United States
| 
|-
| Loss
| align=center| 17–5–1
| Nick Diaz
| Submission (kimura)
| UFC 62: Liddell vs. Sobral
| 
| align=center| 3
| align=center| 1:42
| Las Vegas, Nevada, United States
| 
|-
| Loss
| align=center| 17–4–1
| Josh Burkman
| Decision (unanimous)
| UFC 61: Bitter Rivals
| 
| align=center| 3
| align=center| 5:00
| Las Vegas, Nevada, United States
| 
|-
| Win
| align=center| 17–3–1
| Joe Stevenson
| Decision (unanimous)
| UFC Fight Night 4
| 
| align=center| 3
| align=center| 5:00
| Las Vegas, Nevada, United States
| 
|-
| Win
| align=center| 16–3–1
| Melvin Guillard
| Submission (triangle choke)
| UFC Fight Night 3
| 
| align=center| 1
| align=center| 4:20
| Las Vegas, Nevada, United States
| 
|-
| Win
| align=center| 15–3–1
| Alex Carter
| TKO (punches)
| XKK: Des Moines
| 
| align=center| 1
| align=center| 3:43
| Des Moines, Iowa, United States
| 
|-
| Loss
| align=center| 14–3–1
| Nick Thompson
| Submission (rear-naked choke)
| Extreme Challenge 64
| 
| align=center| 2
| align=center| 2:19
| Osceola, Iowa, United States
| 
|-
| Win
| align=center| 14–2–1
| Forrest Petz
| Submission (triangle choke)
| FFC 15: Fiesta Las Vegas
| 
| align=center| 1
| align=center| 3:25
| Las Vegas, Nevada, United States
| 
|-
| Loss
| align=center| 13–2–1
| Drew Fickett
| Technical Submission (rear-naked choke)
| UFC Ultimate Fight Night
| 
| align=center| 1
| align=center| 1:35
| Las Vegas, Nevada, United States
| 
|-
| Win
| align=center| 13–1–1
| Todd Kiser
| TKO (submission to punches)
| Extreme Challenge 62
| 
| align=center| 1
| align=center| 1:41
| Council Bluffs, Iowa, United States
| 
|-
| Win
| align=center| 12–1–1
| Mark Long
| KO (punch)
| XKK: Des Moines
| 
| align=center| 1
| align=center| 0:54
| Des Moines, Iowa, United States
| 
|-
| Win
| align=center| 11–1–1
| Jay Jack
| Decision (unanimous)
| Extreme Challenge 61
| 
| align=center| 3
| align=center| 5:00
| Medina, Minnesota, United States
| 
|-
| Win
| align=center| 10–1–1
| Derrick Noble
| Submission (triangle choke)
| XKK: Des Moines
| 
| align=center| 1
| align=center| 3:22
| Des Moines, Iowa, United States
| 
|-
| Win
| align=center| 9–1–1
| Terrance Reasby
| TKO (punches)
| Downtown Destruction 2
| 
| align=center| 2
| align=center| 0:52
| Des Moines, Iowa, United States
| 
|-
| Win
| align=center| 8–1–1
| Mark Bear
| KO (knees)
| VFC 8: Fallout
| 
| align=center| 3
| align=center| 3:40
| Council Bluffs, Iowa, United States
| 
|-
| Win
| align=center| 7–1–1
| David Gardner
| TKO (punches)
| XKK: Des Moines
| 
| align=center| 1
| align=center| 1:55
| Des Moines, Iowa, United States
| 
|-
| Win
| align=center| 6–1–1
| Anthony Macias
| TKO (punches)
| FFC 11: Explosion
| 
| align=center| 1
| align=center| 0:41
| Biloxi, Mississippi, United States
| 
|-
| Win
| align=center| 5–1–1
| Fred Leavy
| TKO (punches)
| Xtreme Kage Kombat
| 
| align=center| 1
| align=center| 3:44
| Des Moines, Iowa, United States
| 
|-
| Win
| align=center| 4–1–1
| Kyle Jensen
| Submission (armbar)
| Extreme Challenge 57
| 
| align=center| 3
| align=center| 1:04
| Council Bluffs, Iowa, United States
| 
|-
| Loss
| align=center| 3–1–1
| Spencer Fisher
| Decision (split)
| VFC 7: Showdown
| 
| align=center| 5
| align=center| 5:00
| Council Bluffs, Iowa, United States
| 
|-
| Win
| align=center| 3–0–1
| Joe Chacon
| Decision (unanimous)
| XKK: Clash in Curtiss 4
| 
| align=center| 3
| align=center| 3:00
| Curtiss, Wisconsin, United States
| 
|-
| Draw
| align=center| 2–0–1
| Joe Jordan
| Draw
| AFA: Judgment Night
| 
| align=center| 3
| align=center| 3:00
| Fort Dodge, Iowa, United States
| 
|-
| Win
| align=center| 2–0
| Royce Louck
| TKO (punches)
| Absolute Ada Fights 4
| 
| align=center| 1
| align=center| 1:43
| Ada, Minnesota, United States
| 
|-
| Win
| align=center| 1–0
| Josh Kennedy
| KO (slam)
| Gladiators 20
| 
| align=center| 1
| align=center| 3:41
| Des Moines, Iowa, United States
|

Professional boxing record 

{|class="wikitable" style="text-align:center; font-size:95%"
|-
!
!Result
!Record
!Opponent
!Method
!Round, time
!Date
!Location
!Notes
|- 
|1
|Win
|1–0
|align=left| Ron Krull
|TKO
|1 (4), 2:09
|Dec 17, 2004
|align=left|
|

Bare knuckle record

|Win
|align=center|1–0
|Mike Alderete
|TKO (retirement)
|World Bare Knuckle Fighting Federation
|
|align=center|3
|align=center|2:00
|Casper, Wyoming, United States
|
|-

See also
 List of Bellator MMA alumni
 List of mixed martial artists with professional boxing records
 List of male mixed martial artists

References

External links
Official Josh Neer Website
Official UFC Profile

 BoxRec: Josh Neer

1983 births
Living people
American male mixed martial artists
Mixed martial artists from Iowa
People from Polk County, Iowa
Lightweight mixed martial artists
Welterweight mixed martial artists
Mixed martial artists utilizing boxing
Mixed martial artists utilizing collegiate wrestling
Mixed martial artists utilizing Muay Thai
Mixed martial artists utilizing Brazilian jiu-jitsu
American Muay Thai practitioners
American practitioners of Brazilian jiu-jitsu
Waldorf University alumni
Sportspeople from Des Moines, Iowa
Ultimate Fighting Championship male fighters